Basingstoke is a constituency in Hampshire represented in the House of Commons of the UK Parliament since 2005 by Maria Miller, a member of the Conservative Party who served as Culture Secretary and Minister for Women and Equalities from 2012 to 2014 under Prime Minister David Cameron.

Constituency profile
The constituency is based around the town of Basingstoke, and the surrounding countryside, in Hampshire. Basingstoke is both a commuter town with frequent trains to London and a regional economic centre, making this a prosperous area.

History

Political history
With the exception of a 1923-1924 Liberal MP, since broadening in 1885 it has elected Conservative MPs, and thus meets the longevity indicator, if not majority indicator, as a Conservative safe seat. The closest it came to a non-Conservative victory was in 2001, when its incumbent since 1983, Hunter, in his final election, was returned by 880 votes.

In June 2016, an estimated 53.6% of local adults voting in the EU membership referendum chose to leave the European Union instead of to remain. This was matched in two January 2018 votes in Parliament by its MP.

Content and regional context
The town was represented in the Model Parliament convened in 1295 but not again until the modern seat was created in 1885 which was done on a broad contents basis. From 1295 inclusive to the one year parliament of 1831-32 its area was part of the Hampshire constituency or election of knights of the shire as the event was more often called and from 1832 to 1885 its area lay in the North Hampshire constituency.

Boundaries

1885–1918: The Borough of Basingstoke, and the Sessional Divisions of Basingstoke and Odiham.

1918–1950: The Boroughs of Basingstoke and Andover, and the Rural Districts of Andover, Basingstoke, Kingsclere, Stockbridge, and Whitchurch.

1950–1955: The Boroughs of Basingstoke and Andover, the Rural Districts of Andover, Basingstoke, and Kingsclere and Whitchurch, and in the Rural District of Romsey and Stockbridge the parishes of Ashley, Bossington, Broughton, Buckholt, East Tytherley, Frenchmoor, Houghton, King's Somborne, Leckford, Little Somborne, Longstock, Nether Wallop, Over Wallop, Stockbridge, and West Tytherley.

1955–1974: The Boroughs of Basingstoke and Andover, and the Rural Districts of Andover, Basingstoke, and Kingsclere and Whitchurch.

1974–1983: The Borough of Basingstoke, the Rural Districts of Basingstoke, and Kingsclere and Whitchurch, and in the Rural District of Hartley Wintney the parishes of Bramshill, Dogmersfield, Eversley, Greywell, Hartley Wintney, Heckfield, Hook, Long Sutton, Mattingley, Odiham, Rotherwick, South Warnborough, and Winchfield.  Note: among these Hook was by 1983 commonly considered a town.

1983–1997: The Borough of Basingstoke and Deane wards of Basing, Black Dam, Bramley, Brighton Hill, Buckskin, Chapel, Daneshill, Eastrop, Farleigh Wallop, Kempshott, King's Furlong, Norden, North Waltham, Oakley, Pamber, Popley, Sherborne St John, Sherfield on Loddon, Silchester, South Ham, Upton Grey, Viables, Westside, and Winklebury.

1997–2010: The Borough of Basingstoke and Deane wards of Basing, Brighton Hill, Brookvale, Buckskin, Calleva, Chineham, Eastrop, Grove, Hatch Warren, Kempshott, Norden, Popley, South Ham, Upton Grey, and Winklebury.

2010–present: The Borough of Basingstoke and Deane wards of Basing, Brighton Hill North, Brighton Hill South, Brookvale and King's Furlong, Buckskin, Chineham, Eastrop, Grove, Hatch Warren and Beggarwood, Kempshott, Norden, Popley East, Popley West, Rooksdown, South Ham, and Winklebury.

Members of Parliament

Elections

Elections in the 2010s

 

 

For the 2015 election, the Green Party attempted to field two candidates who would job share. Sarah Cope has young children and Clare Lorraine Phipps who is disabled, so neither could work as a full-time MP. Their application was rejected.

Elections in the 2000s

Elections in the 1990s

Elections in the 1980s

Elections in the 1970s

Elections in the 1960s

Elections in the 1950s

Elections in the 1940s

Elections in the 1930s

Election in the 1920s

Election in the 1910s

Election results, 1885–1918

Elections in the 1880s 

Sclater-Booth was elevated to the peerage, becoming Lord Basing, requiring a by-election.

Elections in the 1890s

Elections in the 1900s

Elections in the 1910s 

General Election 1914–15:

Another General Election was required to take place before the end of 1915. The political parties had been making preparations for an election to take place and by July 1914, the following candidates had been selected; 
Unionist: Arthur Salter
Liberal:

See also
 List of parliamentary constituencies in Hampshire

Notes

References

Parliamentary constituencies in South East England
Parliament
Constituencies of the Parliament of the United Kingdom established in 1885
Parliamentary constituencies in Hampshire